Mangalam Veettil Manaseswari Gupta is 1995 Malayalam film starring Jayaram and Vani Viswanath.The film had musical score compossed by Johnson.

Plot
A grandfather tries to find a groom for his granddaughter Maya, who returns from Mumbai. However, he does not know that she is already married to photographer Jayadevan. There is a parallel plot line in which a few underworld dons are trying to retrieve diamonds from Maya, which she possesses unknowingly.

Cast
Jayaram as Jayadevan 
Vani Viswanath as Maya Surendran / Manaseswari Gupta      
Narendra Prasad as Mangalam Veetil Mooppil Nair 
Janardhanan as  Achuthankutty \ Eldest Son of Nair
Innocent as Narayanankutty \ Second son of Nair
K.P.A.C. Lalitha as Kamalakshi \ Elder Daughter of Nair
Jagathy Sreekumar as Sivankutty \ Achuthankutti's son
Mamukkoya as Koya

Jose Pellissery as Sahadevan \ Kamalakshi's Husband
Indrans as Dasan /  Paramanada Gupta
Cochin Haneefa as Kunjayan
A. C. Zainuddin as Albert 
V. D. Rajappan as Musthafa
Kanakalatha as Narayanankutty's Wife
K. R. Vatsala as Vishalam - Achuthankutty's Wife
Meena (Malayalam actress) as Annamma 
Mani C. Kappan as Govindankutty 
Bindu Panicker as Vasumathi 
Rizabawa as Sethumadhavan 
Chembu Sajin
Tony as Vasunni \ Kamalakshi's Son
K. T. S. Padannayil as Carpenter Karappai
Keerikkadan Jose as Bada Usthad

External links
 

1990s Malayalam-language films
1995 romantic comedy films
1995 films
Indian romantic comedy films